The badminton women's doubles tournament at the 2016 Summer Olympics took place from 11 to 17 August at Riocentro - Pavilion 4. The seeding was decided on 21 July 2016.

Competition format

The tournament started with a group phase round-robin followed by a knockout stage.

Seeds 
A total of 4 pairs were given seeds.

 (gold medalists)
 (fourth place)
 (quarter-finals)
 (bronze medalists)

Results

Group stage

Group A

Group B

Group C

Group D

Finals

References 

Badminton at the 2016 Summer Olympics
Women's events at the 2016 Summer Olympics
Olymp